Caroline Mary Ford (born 13 May 1988) is an English actress. She is known for her roles as Sam in the Netflix series Free Rein (2017) and Sophie Longerbane in the Amazon Prime series Carnival Row (2019–2023).

Early life
Ford took classes at the Carol Kristian Theatre School. She went on to graduate with a Scottish Master of Arts in History of Art from St Andrews University. Ford also pursued modeling, signing up to the Stolen agency in Edinburgh.

Career 
In 2010, Ford made her professional television debut in the BBC medical drama Casualty. The following year, she appeared in a number of short films including Nick Rowland's Fair Belles and Eitan Arrusi's The Crypt. Her others credits include some independent films, such as Don Michael Paul's Lake Placid: The Final Chapter, Simon Blake's Still, and as Maxine in The Callback Queen (2013). In 2014, she was cast as Peshet in the Fox adventure series Hieroglyph. However, the series was cancelled before airing. The same year, Ford made a guest appearance in Sleepy Hollows second series as Lilith, before being cast as Spindle in Travis Beacham's 2015 short film The Curiosity.

Ford then appeared in the 2015 film Anti-Social as Rochelle, alongside Meghan Markle. In 2017, Ford played Sam in the first series of the Netflix children's series Free Rein, before landing the role of Sophie Longerbane in the Prime series Carnival Row. The second and final season will be released in 2023.

Personal life
Ford married Freddy Carter on 3 December 2022, having met on the set of Free Rein and been in a relationship since 2018.

Filmography

Film

Television

References

External links
 

Living people
1988 births
21st-century English actresses
Alumni of RADA
Alumni of the University of St Andrews
English film actresses
English people of Chinese descent
English people of Scottish descent
English people of Trinidad and Tobago descent
English television actresses